Dzoragyugh is a village in the Martuni Municipality of the Gegharkunik Province of Armenia. There is a ruined church dating back to the 9th century as well as a hermitage also of the 9th century in the village.

Gallery

References

External links 

 
 

Populated places in Gegharkunik Province